James Mason Hutchings (February 10, 1820 – October 31, 1902) was an American businessman and one of the principal promoters of what is now Yosemite National Park.

Biography 
Born in Towcester in England, Hutchings immigrated to the U.S. in 1848, then went to California in 1849 during the Gold Rush. He became wealthy as a miner, lost it all in a bank failure, then became wealthy again from publishing.

In 1853, he published The Miner's Ten Commandments.

On July 5, 1855 James Hutchings set out on what would be one of the most historic trips to the region, leading the second tourist party into Yosemite. (The first tourist party, in 1854, was led by Robert Bruce Lamon, but no account of the trip is known to be written.) He then became one of the first settlers in Yosemite Valley. Hutchings published an illustrated magazine, Hutchings' Illustrated California Magazine that told the world about Yosemite and the Sierra. It was said "...upon the return of Hutchings' party, the descriptions staggered the skeptics and silenced the croakers. From this time forward can be considered the commencement of the visits of tourists." He was a tireless promoter, of himself and Yosemite. After Yosemite Valley was granted to California as protected land in 1864, Hutchings, through his interpretation of existing preemption laws, believed he was entitled to 160 acres (647,000 m²) of land in the Valley. He sued, unsuccessfully, to have those acres deeded to himself; the U.S. Supreme Court ruled Congress could establish the Yosemite Grant. He did, however, get a generous payment from the state to help compensate for loss of land use. In 1875, he was banished from Yosemite Valley because of his constant challenging of the law prohibiting the construction of buildings on public lands.

Hutchings remarried twice and was an innkeeper for the Calaveras Big Tree Grove Hotel, north of Yosemite. Hutchings' prominence in Yosemite Valley allowed him to connect with figures of great importance to the history of Yosemite, including John Muir, Galen Clark and James McCauley.

While visiting Yosemite, Hutchings was killed on October 31, 1902, when his horse reared and threw him from his buggy. He is buried at Yosemite Cemetery.

Further reading
 
 Mrs. H. J. Taylor "James Mason Hutchings" in Yosemite Indians and Other Sketches (1936)
 James M. Hutchings "California for Waterfalls!,"  San Francisco Daily California Chronicle (August 18, 1855) Contains an account of the first or second tourist party to Yosemite Valley
 James M. Hutchings, editor, Hutchings' Illustrated California Magazine (1856–1861)
 James M. Hutchings "The Great Yo-Semite Valley," Hutchings' California Magazine, (October 1859). First account of Yosemite Valley with illustrations
 James M. Hutchings  Scenes of Wonder and Curiosity in California (1862). First travel guide for Yosemite Valley.
 James M. Hutchings In the Heart of the Sierras (1888) 
 Hank Johnston Yosemite's Yesterdays, v. 2, chapter 2 (1991) has a biography of James Hutchings
 Another detailed biography of Hutchings can be found in Peter E. Palmquist and Thomas R. Kailbourn, Pioneer Photographers of the Far West: A Biographical Dictionary, 1840-1865 (Stanford, CA:  Stanford University Press, 2000), pp. 312–316.
 Hutchings' 1855 travel journal (along with his 1848-49 emigration journal) is available at the Library of Congress, catalog number MMC-1892

References

External links
 
 
 "A New Commandment" and "Third Commandment", two short radio readings from Hutchings' "The Miners' Ten Commandments," (California State Library) from the California Legacy Project.
 James M. Hutchings collection, 1873–1942. California State Library, California History Room.

1820 births
1902 deaths
American real estate businesspeople
Sierra Nevada (United States)
Yosemite National Park
Deaths by horse-riding accident in the United States
Accidental deaths in California
19th-century American businesspeople